Claudio Echeverri (born 2 January 2006) is an Argentine footballer currently playing as a forward for River Plate.

Club career
Born in Resistencia, Chaco Province, Echeverri started his career with Deportivo Luján, before trialling with River Plate at the end of 2016, going on to sign officially the following year. He first rose to international attention in the footballing world for his performances at a children's tournament in Venice, Italy with River. Despite his team finishing third in the tournament, he scored nine goals in six games, stating "The truth is that we are not happy [finishing third], we wanted to be champions".

In October 2022, he scored on his debut for River's reserve team against Patronato. He signed his first professional contract with River in December of the same year.

International career
Echeverri has represented Argentina at under-17 level.

Style of play
Nicknamed El Diablito (Spanish: little devil) after former Bolivian international footballer Marco Etcheverry, who was nicknamed El Diablo, as the two share "devilish" dribbling, pace in one-on-one situations, and a powerful shot, as well as a similar last name. He has listed Lionel Messi and former River player Juan Fernando Quintero as two players he idolises, while he has stated that he models his game on Matías Suárez.

References

External links
 

2006 births
Living people
People from Resistencia, Chaco
Sportspeople from Chaco Province
Argentine footballers
Argentina youth international footballers
Association football forwards
Club Atlético River Plate footballers